Chloropteryx is a genus of moths in the family Geometridae.

Species
 Chloropteryx nordicaria (Schaus, 1901)
 Chloropteryx paularia (Möschler, 1886)
 Chloropteryx tepperaria (Hulst, 1886) - angle-winged emerald moth

References
 Chloropteryx at Markku Savela's Lepidoptera and Some Other Life Forms
 Natural History Museum Lepidoptera genus database

Hemitheini